Gregorio Ladino Vega (born January 18, 1973 in San Mateo, Boyacá) is a Colombian former professional road cyclist. Since 2011, he holds a Mexican citizenship.

Major results

1995
 1st  Young rider classification Vuelta a Colombia
1997
 1st  Overall Vuelta a Costa Rica
 1st Stage 12 Vuelta a Colombia
2001
 1st  Overall Vuelta a Costa Rica
 1st  Overall Vuelta a Guatemala
 1st Stage 3 Vuelta a Colombia
2002
 2nd Overall Vuelta a Costa Rica
2003
 1st  Overall Vuelta a la Independencia Nacional
 1st Stage 9 Vuelta a Chiriquí
 1st Stage 4 Vuelta a Costa Rica
2005
 2nd Overall Clásico Ciclístico Banfoandes
1st Stage 3
 8th Overall Tour of the Gila
2006
 1st  Overall Vuelta Sonora
 1st  Overall Vuelta a El Salvador
 2nd Overall UCI America Tour
 3rd Overall Clásico Ciclístico Banfoandes
 6th Overall Vuelta a Chihuahua
 7th Overall Vuelta Oaxaca
 7th Overall Tour de Beauce
 7th Univest Grand Prix
2007
 1st  Mountains classification Vuelta a Chihuahua
 4th Overall Tour de Beauce
1st  Mountains classification
 6th Overall Doble Sucre Potosí GP Cemento Fancesa
 9th Overall Vuelta a El Salvador
1st Stage 5
2008
 1st  Overall Tour of the Gila
1st Stage 1
 1st  Overall Vuelta Ciclista Chiapas
1st Stages 1a & 6
 1st Stage 8 Vuelta a Cuba
 1st  Mountains classification Vuelta Mexico Telmex
 2nd Overall Vuelta a Chihuahua
1st Stage 2
 2nd Overall Doble Sucre Potosí GP Cemento Fancesa
1st Stage 5
2009
 1st  Road race, Pan American Cycling Championships
 1st  Overall Vuelta a Bolivia
 2nd Overall Doble Sucre Potosí GP Cemento Fancesa
1st Stages 2 & 5
 2010
 3rd Overall Vuelta Mexico Telmex
 4th Overall Vuelta a Venezuela
 5th Overall Vuelta a Bolivia
 2011
 Mexican National Road Championships
1st  Road race
2nd Time trial
 8th Overall Vuelta Ciclista Chiapas
1st  Mountains classification
1st Stage 3

References
 

1973 births
Living people
Colombian male cyclists
Vuelta a Colombia stage winners
Sportspeople from Boyacá Department